Who is Dr Who is a compilation of novelty singles relating to the BBC television series Doctor Who.  Released in 2000, it features 18 tracks originally released between 1964 and 1973, including the show's theme tune, The Go Go's "I'm Gonna Spend My Christmas With a Dalek", and "Who's Who" by child actress Roberta Tovey, who starred in the sixties films Dr. Who and the Daleks and Daleks – Invasion Earth 2150 AD.

Track listing

References 

 
 
 

Music based on Doctor Who
Themed compilation albums
Novelty albums
2000 compilation albums
RPM Records (United Kingdom) albums